The 2016–17 season was Hibernian's (Hibs) third season of play in the second tier of Scottish football the Scottish Championship, since they were relegated from the Scottish Premiership at the end of the 2013–14 season. Hibs also competed in the Europa League, Challenge Cup, League Cup and they defended the Scottish Cup after winning the 2016 final.

Summary

Season
Hibernian finished first in the Championship, earning automatic promotion to the Scottish Premiership. They reached the Second qualifying round of the Europa League, the fourth round of the Challenge Cup, the second round of the League Cup and the Semi final of the Scottish Cup.

Management
With one year remaining on his contract on 1 June 2016, Alan Stubbs resigned as Hibernian manager. Stubbs joined Football League Championship side Rotherham United along with assistant manager John Doolan, with compensation payable to Hibernian. On 8 June 2016, Neil Lennon was appointed as manager on a two-year deal, with Garry Parker appointed as assistant manager.

Results and fixtures

Friendlies

Scottish Championship

Europa League

League Cup

Challenge Cup

Scottish Cup

Player statistics
During the 2016–17 season, Hibs used thirty different players in competitive games. The table below shows the number of appearances and goals scored by each player. David Gray was club captain for the season.

a.  Includes other competitive competitions, including the play-offs and the Challenge Cup.

Disciplinary record

Club statistics

League table

Division summary

Management statistics

Transfers

Players in

Players out

Loans in

Loans out

See also
List of Hibernian F.C. seasons

Notes

References

2016-17
Scottish football clubs 2016–17 season
2016–17 UEFA Europa League participants seasons